Converse Heights Historic District is a national historic district located at Spartanburg, Spartanburg County, South Carolina. It encompasses 460 contributing buildings in a residential section of Spartanburg. The district documents the prevalent housing types for middle and upper class citizens from about 1900 to 1940. It includes residences representative of the Queen Anne,  American Foursquare, American Craftsman, Spanish Mission, Tudor, Colonial Revival, and Neo-Classical styles.

It was listed on the National Register of Historic Places in 2007.

References

Historic districts on the National Register of Historic Places in South Carolina
Colonial Revival architecture in South Carolina
Mission Revival architecture in South Carolina
Tudor Revival architecture in South Carolina
Neoclassical architecture in South Carolina
Queen Anne architecture in South Carolina
Buildings and structures in Spartanburg, South Carolina
National Register of Historic Places in Spartanburg County, South Carolina